"King of the Dancehall" is the second single by Beenie Man from his studio album Back to Basics. It was written by Tony Kelly, Maurice Gregory, and Beenie Man himself. It was produced by Tony "CD" Kelly.

Charts

Release history

References

2004 singles
2004 songs
Beenie Man songs
Virgin Records singles